is a Japanese professional shogi player ranked 8-dan.

Promotion history
The promotion history for Akutsu is as follows:
 6-kyū: 1994
 1-dan: 1997
 4-dan: October 1, 1999
 5-dan: July 2, 2004
 6-dan: August 3, 2007
 7-dan: April 1, 2009
 8-dan: February 13, 2014

Titles and other championships

Awards and honors
Akutsu received the Japan Shogi Association Annual Shogi Awards for "Best New Player" in 2004, "Best Winning Percentage" in 2006, and "Most Consecutive Games Won" award in 2009.

Year-end prize money and game fee ranking
Akutsu has finished in the "Top 10" of the JSA's  only once during his career. He earned a total of JPY 25,700,000 to rank ninth in 2009.

References

External links
 ShogiHub: Professional Player Info · Akutsu, Chikara
 

1982 births
Japanese shogi players
Living people
Professional shogi players
Professional shogi players from Hyōgo Prefecture
People from Nishinomiya
Ginga